Mama Uqllu (Hispanicized spelling Mama Occllo, Mama Ocllo, Mama Okllo), also Puntiagudo (Spanish for sharp pointed), is a mountain in the Bolivian Andes, about  high. It lies in the northern part of the Kimsa Cruz mountain range, south of the mountain Kalsunani (Calzonani) and west of Taruja Umaña. It is situated in the La Paz Department, at the border of the Inquisivi Province, Quime Municipality, and the Loayza Province, Cairoma Municipality, north of the village of Viloco.

Mama Uqllu lake 
Mama Uqllu (Mama Okllo) is also the name of the little lake south or south-east of the mountain.

See also
 Quri Ch'uma
 Yaypuri
 List of mountains in the Andes

References 

Mountains of La Paz Department (Bolivia)
Lakes of La Paz Department (Bolivia)